Born in America is the fifth studio album released by the American heavy metal band Riot, released in 1983. After getting dropped by Elektra Records the band signed with Canadian indie label Quality Records for what was to be the second and last record with Rhett Forrester on vocals. This was also the last album for guitarist Rick Ventura, bassist Kip Leming, and drummer Sandy Slavin.

Germany's ZYX Music released the album in Europe, accompanied by a 12" single, "Warrior (live) b/w Born in America".

Born In America was re-issued in 1989 by Grand Slamm Records in the U.S. and CBS/Sony Records in Japan, both with different artwork. A further U.S. re-issue followed in 1999 through Metal Blade Records, utilizing the original cover artwork.
Born In America was re-issued again in 2015.

Track listing

Personnel

Riot
 Rhett Forrester - vocals
 Mark Reale - guitars
 Rick Ventura - guitars
 Kip Leming - bass
 Sandy Slavin - drums

Production
Steve Loeb - producer
Rod Hui - associate producer, engineer, mixing
Howie Weinberg - mastering

References

Riot V albums
1983 albums
Quality Records albums